The Marcello Mastroianni Award (Italian: Premio Marcello Mastroianni) is one of the awards given out at the Venice International Film Festival. It was established in 1998 in honor of the Italian actor Marcello Mastroianni, who died at the end of 1996. The award was created to recognize an emerging actor or actress.

Award winners

External links
The Venice Film Festival at the IMDb

Venice Film Festival
 
Italian film awards
Awards for young actors
Marcello Mastroianni Award